The Philippine High School for the Arts (PHSA) is a specialized public high school in the Philippines offering arts-focused education established in 1978 by virtue of Presidential Decree 1287. An attached agency of the Department of Education, it consults with the Cultural Center of the Philippines for policy and program implementation of its arts program. Aside from the Basic Education curriculum prescribed by the government, it offers various specializations in the field of arts.

Entrance to the school is highly competitive: at any given time, it has a small population of 130-145 students. Students accepted into the PHSA are given full scholarship and living assistance. Its campus is located in the National Arts Center in Mount Makiling, Los Baños, Laguna.

Academics and Student Life
Every year, the school opens its application process through the Annual Nationwide Search for Young Arts Scholars (ANSYAS). Applicants must be graduating Filipino elementary school students not more than 14 years old with outstanding abilities in the arts. Once accepted, students undergo basic education classes in the morning and specialized instruction in the afternoon. There are currently five fields of specialization that the school offers:

Creative Writing
Dance (Folk and Ballet)
Music
Theater Arts
Visual Arts

It is estimated that the government spends around Ph₱ 500,000.00 (US$11,000 in 2012) per student in his or her stay in the school. Upon graduation, scholars pursuing higher education are obligated to enroll in an arts course. Similar to other specialized schools, graduating batches have names. The first batch that graduated in 1979 was named in honor of National Artist Guillermo Tolentino.

Controversy 
Due to numerous sexual abuse allegations, DepEd insisted and requested help from the NBI to investigate the school immediately in accordance with the letter sent by Vice President and Secretary of Education Sarah Duterte on July 11, 2022.

At the end of the investigation, the NBI identified three suspects: a senior student, a teacher, and a male dormitory parent. The school administration also responded to the issue saying that they will ensure that this will not happen again and promised to provide a good learning environment for their students.

Notable alumni
Rowena Arrieta, concert pianist
Leila Florentino, lead singer, performer in the Broadway-run Miss Saigon. 
Grace S. Nono, singer, ethnomusicologist, and cultural activist
Diwa de Leon, film composer, musician & YouTube artist
Shamaine Centenera, actress for stage, film, and television
Cherrie Pinpin, PH first Female Paralympic Sailor & Para World Sailing Champion
Elijah Canlas - Actor, Gawad Pasado 2020 Best Supporting Actor (Edward), 17th Asian Film Festival 2020 Best Actor (Kalel, 15), 43rd Gawad Urian Best Actor (Kalel, 15), 68th FAMAS Award Best actor (Kalel, 15)

References

Education in Los Baños, Laguna
High schools in Laguna (province)
Department of Education (Philippines)
Establishments by Philippine presidential decree